4-Phenylphenol, also known as biphenyl-4-ol and 4-hydroxybiphenyl is an organic compound. It is a phenol analog of biphenyl.

Production
4-Phenylphenol can be obtained from the Suzuki coupling of phenylboronic acid with 4-iodophenol in the presence of 10% palladium on carbon and potassium carbonate.

Properties
4-Phenylphenol is a flammable, difficult to ignite, white, scaly solid with a phenol-like odor that is very slightly soluble in water.

References 

Phenols
Biphenyls